Modern Love may refer to:

Film 
 Modern Love (1918 film), a silent film starring Mae Murray
 Modern Love (1929 film), a part-talking film distributed by Universal Pictures
 Modern Love (1990 film), a film by Robby Benson
 Modern Love (2006 film), a film by Alex Frayne
 Modern Love (2008 film), a French film starring Stéphane Rousseau

Music 
 Modern Love, an electronic music label founded by Andy Stott

Albums
 Modern Love (Kids of 88 album), 2012
 Modern Love (Matt Nathanson album) or the title song, 2011
 Modern Love, by Whitehorse, 2021

Songs
 "Modern Love" (song), by David Bowie, 1983
 "Modern Love", by Courteneers from Mapping the Rendezvous, 2016
 "Modern Love", by Kish Mauve from Black Heart, 2009
 "Modern Love", by Peter Gabriel from Peter Gabriel, 1977
 "Modern Love", by RuPaul from Born Naked, 2014

Other media 
 Modern Love (poetry collection), an 1862 collection of sonnets by George Meredith
 "Modern Love" (Degrassi: The Next Generation), an episode of Degrassi: The Next Generation
 "Modern Love" (column), a column in The New York Times
 Modern Love (TV series), an American streaming television series based on the column

See also
 Modern Lovers (disambiguation)